The Choctaw-Nicoma Park School District is the 19th largest school district in Oklahoma with an enrollment of around 5,800 as of 2019–20, including elementary through high school students at nine sites.

Choctaw-Nicoma Park is a public school district covering about 60-square-miles located in eastern Oklahoma County.

Schools

2009 Bond Issue
In November 2008, Choctaw-Nicoma Park voters passed a 54 million dollar bond issue to provide funding for two new schools. The two new schools were Choctaw Middle School and Nicoma Park Elementary which were completed by the 2011–2012 school year.

Elementary schools
Nicoma Park Elementary, grades PreK-2
Indian Meridian Elementary, grades PreK-2
Choctaw Elementary, grades PreK-5
Westfall Elementary, grades PreK-5
James Griffith Intermediate, grades 3-5
Nicoma Park Intermediate, grades 3-5
Nicoma Park Elementary, grades Prek-2

Middle schools
Choctaw Middle School, grades 6-8
Nicoma Park Middle School, grades 6-8

High school
Choctaw High School, grades 9–12, Enrollment: 1675 students

Choctaw Middle School
Choctaw Middle School was constructed for 800 students and currently has an enrollment of about 700 students.

Nicoma Park Middle School
Nicoma Park Middle School has an enrollment of over 600 students.

References

School districts in Oklahoma
Education in Oklahoma County, Oklahoma